The 1995 NFL season was the 76th regular season of the National Football League (NFL). The league expanded to 30 teams with the addition of the Carolina Panthers and the Jacksonville Jaguars. The two expansion teams were slotted into the two remaining divisions that previously had only four teams (while the other four had five teams): the AFC Central (Jaguars) and the NFC West (Panthers).

Meanwhile, the two teams in Los Angeles relocated to other cities: the Rams transferred to St. Louis and the Raiders moved back to Oakland; this would be the start of a 20-year absence for the NFL in Los Angeles. During the course of the season it emerged that the Cleveland Browns would relocate to Baltimore for the 1996 season. The Raiders’ move was not announced until after the schedule had been announced, which resulted in a problem in the third week of the season when both the Raiders and the San Francisco 49ers had games scheduled to air on NBC which ended up overlapping each other. The Raiders game was rescheduled for 10:00 a.m. PDT in case they were to relocate and NBC was given the doubleheader so that both Bay Area teams had their games televised locally.

The season ended with Super Bowl XXX, when the Dallas Cowboys defeated the Pittsburgh Steelers 27–17 at Sun Devil Stadium. They became the first team in NFL history to win three Super Bowls in four years. This season was Miami Dolphins head coach Don Shula’s last season as coach.

Player movement

Transactions
July 27: The Tampa Bay Bucaneers signed linebacker Tommy Thigpen
July 27: The Miami Dolphins signed Defensive End Steve Emtman
July 29: The New York Giants signed Jessie Armstead
July 29: The Indianapolis Colts signed wide receiver Wendell Davis

Retirements
April 18, 1995: Four-time Super Bowl champion quarterback Joe Montana announced his retirement. He spent the last two seasons of his career with the Kansas City Chiefs.

Draft
The 1995 NFL draft was held from April 22 to 23, 1995 at New York City's Theater at Madison Square Garden. With the first pick, the Cincinnati Bengals selected running back Ki-Jana Carter from Penn State University.

Expansion Draft
The 1995 NFL expansion draft was held on February 15, 1995. The Jacksonville Jaguars held the first pick overall, while the Carolina Panthers were second, alternating picks as the existing teams made six players available for selection,. The Panthers ultimately picked 35 players, while the Jaguars picked 31. With the first selection in the Expansion Draft, the Jaguars selected quarterback Steve Beuerlein from the Arizona Cardinals. Selecting second, the Panthers obtained cornerback Rod Smith from the New England Patriots.

New referees
Mike Carey and Walt Coleman were promoted to referee; Carey became the second African-American referee in NFL history following Johnny Grier, who was promoted in 1988. Dale Hamer had to sit out the 1995 season to recover from open heart surgery, while league expansion from 28 to 30 teams required an additional officiating crew.

Major rule changes
An eligible receiver forced out of bounds by a defensive player may return to the field and automatically become eligible to legally be the first player to touch a forward pass.
Quarterbacks may now receive communications from the bench from a small radio receiver in their helmets, partly repealing a rule that had been in force since 1956.

Preseason

American Bowl
A series of National Football League pre-season exhibition games that were held at sites outside the United States. Two games were contested in 1995.

Hall of Fame Game
The Pro Football Hall of Fame Game featured the NFL's newest expansions teams, as the Carolina Panthers defeated the Jacksonville Jaguars 20-14, was played on July 29, and held at Tom Benson Hall of Fame Stadium in Canton, Ohio, the same city where the league was founded. The 1995 Hall of Fame Class included Jim Finks, Henry Jordan, Steve Largent, Lee Roy Selmon and Kellen Winslow

Regular season

Scheduling formula

Highlights of the 1995 season included:
Thanksgiving: Two games were played on Thursday, November 23, featuring the Minnesota Vikings at Detroit and Kansas City Chiefs at Dallas, with Detroit and Dallas winning.
Snowball Game (1995): In the final weekend of the season, the New York Giants hosted the San Diego Chargers. Giants fans threw snowballs onto the field throughout the contest. This action resulted in 15 arrests and the ejection of 175 fans from Giants Stadium; San Diego posted a 27–17 victory in what became known as the "Snowball Game".

Final standings

Tiebreakers
Indianapolis finished ahead of Miami in the AFC East based on head-to-head sweep (2–0).
San Diego was the first AFC Wild Card based on head-to-head victory over Indianapolis (1–0).
Cincinnati finished ahead of Houston in the AFC Central based on better division record (4–4 to Oilers’ 3–5).
Seattle finished ahead of Denver and Oakland in the AFC West based on best head-to-head record (3–1 to Broncos’ 2–2 and Raiders’ 1–3).
Denver finished ahead of Oakland in the AFC West based on head-to-head sweep (2–0).
Philadelphia was the first NFC Wild Card ahead of Detroit based on better conference record (9–3 to Lions’ 7–5).
San Francisco was the second NFC playoff seed ahead of Green Bay based on better conference record (8–4 to Packers’ 7–5).
Atlanta was the third NFC Wild Card ahead of Chicago based on better record against common opponents (4–2 to Bears’ 3–3).
St. Louis finished ahead of Carolina and New Orleans in the NFC West based on best head-to-head record (3–1 to Panthers’ 1–3 and Saints’ 2–2).
Carolina finished ahead of New Orleans in the NFC West based on better conference record (4–8 to 3–9).

Playoffs

Milestones
The following players set all-time records during the season:

Statistical leaders

Team

Individual

The 1995 season produced four of the top twenty highest single-season totals for receiving yards. Two of the top five teams receiving yard totals of all time – Jerry Rice's 1,848 & Isaac Bruce's 1,781 – were recorded in 1995. Detroit Lions receiver Herman Moore gained 1,686 yards (6th highest all time) and Dallas Cowboys receiver Michael Irvin gained 1,603 yards (11th most in NFL history).

Awards

Coaching changes

Offseason
 Denver Broncos: Mike Shanahan replaced the fired Wade Phillips
 Carolina Panthers: Dom Capers became this expansion team's first head coach.
 Houston Oilers: Jeff Fisher became the permanent head coach. Fisher served as interim for the final six games of 1994 after Jack Pardee was fired.
 Jacksonville Jaguars: Tom Coughlin became this expansion team's first head coach.
 Oakland Raiders: Mike White replaced the fired Art Shell for the Raiders' first season since returning to Oakland.
 Philadelphia Eagles: Ray Rhodes replaced the fired Rich Kotite.
 New York Jets: Rich Kotite replaced the fired Pete Carroll. 
 Seattle Seahawks: Dennis Erickson replaced the fired Tom Flores.
 St. Louis Rams: Rich Brooks replaced the fired Chuck Knox for the Rams's first season in St. Louis.

In-season
 Buffalo Bills: Elijah Pitts served as interim for three games while Marv Levy recovered from prostate cancer surgery.

Stadium changes
 Carolina Panthers: The expansion Panthers played their first season at Memorial Stadium in Clemson, South Carolina while their new stadium in Charlotte, North Carolina remained under construction
 Green Bay Packers: This is the first season since 1932 that the Packers played full time in Green Bay, no longer playing select games in Milwaukee
 Jacksonville Jaguars: The expansion Jaguars moved into Jacksonville Municipal Stadium on the site of the former Gator Bowl Stadium
 Oakland Raiders: The relocated Raiders moved back from the Los Angeles Memorial Coliseum to the Oakland–Alameda County Coliseum
 St. Louis Rams: The relocated Rams initially moved from Anaheim Stadium to Busch Memorial Stadium in St. Louis. The Trans World Dome then opened for their fifth regular season home game, with Trans World Airlines acquiring the naming rights
 San Francisco 49ers: Candlestick Park was renamed 3Com Park after the digital electronics manufacturer 3Com acquired the naming rights

Uniform changes
 The inaugural Carolina Panthers uniforms featured gray helmets, blue trim, black jerseys with white numbers and gray pants, and white jerseys with black numbers and white pants. The helmet logo featured a black panther head with blue trim.
 The Dallas Cowboys wore a navy blue version of the white "Double-Star" alternate jerseys they wore in 1994, with blue sleeves and white star logos on the shoulders. The white "Double Star" jersey was discontinued due to a since-repealed NFL policy which allowed teams only one colored jersey and one white jersey except for special occasions. 
 The Houston Oilers began wearing their white pants with their white jerseys, discontinuing their blue pants. This was the first time the Oilers wore white pants with white jerseys for a full season since 1980. 
 The Indianapolis Colts experimented with wearing blue pants with their white jerseys for their first three games. 
 The inaugural Jacksonville Jaguars uniforms featured black helmets, teal jerseys with white numbers, white jerseys with teal numbers, and white pants. The helmet logo featured a jaguar head with a teal tongue.
 The New England Patriots switched from block numbers to a rounded number font with a drop shadow. The "Flying Elvis" helmet logo was repeated on the shoulders, and TV numbers moved to the sleeves.
 The New York Jets removed the black trim from the nameplates on jerseys.
 The Philadelphia Eagles removed the black trim from their jersey numbers and nameplates.
 The St. Louis Rams removed the gold stripping on their blue socks.

Television
This was the second year under the league's four-year broadcast contracts with ABC, Fox, NBC, TNT, and ESPN. ABC, Fox, and NBC continued to televise Monday Night Football, the NFC package, the AFC package, respectively. Sunday night games aired on TNT during the first half of the season, and ESPN during the second half of the season.

NBC renamed its pregame show as simply The NFL on NBC. The then-recently retired quarterback Joe Montana joined the show as an analyst, alongside Greg Gumbel, Mike Ditka, and Joe Gibbs. Phil Simms and Paul Maguire joined Dick Enberg as NBC's lead broadcast team, replacing Bob Trumpy.

Verne Lundquist replaced Gary Bender as TNT's play-by-play announcer. TNT also renamed its pregame show as Pro Football Tonight, with Vince Cellini as its host.

External links
Football Outsiders 1995 DVOA Ratings and Commentary
Football Outsiders 1995 team offense stats
Football Outsiders 1995 team defense stats
Football Outsiders 1995 special teams stats

References

 NFL Record and Fact Book
 NFL History 1991–2000 (Last accessed October 17, 2005)
 Total Football: The Official Encyclopedia of the National Football League
 Steelers Fever – History of NFL Rules (Last accessed October 17, 2005)

National Football League seasons
 
National Football League